Michael Thorbjornsen (born September 16, 2001) is an American amateur golfer.

Early life and family
Thorbjornsen was born in Cleveland, Ohio. He is the son of Thorbjorn Thorbjornsen, a Norwegian, and Sandra Chiang, a Zimbabwean who was a golfer at Ursuline College. He first tried golf at two years old. His siblings are Victoria Lotus, Michelle Caprise and Teresa Corniche.

Career
Thorbjornsen won the 2018 U.S. Junior Amateur at Baltusrol Golf Club. The win qualified him for the 2019 U.S. Open at Pebble Beach Golf Links, where he made the cut, the first U.S. Junior Amateur champion to do so since the exemption that was introduced. 

In 2020, Thorbjornsen graduated from Wellesley High School and enrolled at Stanford University, joining the Stanford Cardinal men's golf team.

He reached the quarterfinals of the 2020 U.S. Amateur at Bandon Dunes. He won the 2021 Western Amateur and Massachusetts Amateur, defeating 2017 U.S. Mid-Amateur champion Matt Parziale in the final match. He played on the 2022 Eisenhower Trophy and 2022 Arnold Palmer Cup teams.

Thorbjornsen qualified for his second U.S. Open in 2022 via an 8-for-3 playoff at Century and Old Oaks Country Clubs in Purchase, N.Y., after shooting 2-under 138 over 36 holes. 

Thorbjornsen finished 4th in the 2022 Travelers Championship at the TPC River Highlands in Cromwell, Connecticut. Because Thorbjornsen was competing as an amateur, Chesson Hadley, who finished 5th, took home the $406,700 in prize money that would have otherwise gone to Thorbjornsen.

Amateur wins
2018 U.S. Junior Amateur, PING Invitational
2021 Massachusetts Amateur, Western Amateur
2022 OFCC Fighting Illini Invite

Source:

Results in major championships
Results not in chronological order in 2020.

CUT = missed the half-way cut

NT = No tournament due to the COVID-19 pandemic

U.S. national team appearances
Junior Ryder Cup: 2018 (winners)
Junior Presidents Cup: 2019 (winners)
Arnold Palmer Cup: 2022
Eisenhower Trophy: 2022

References

External links

American male golfers
Stanford Cardinal men's golfers
Amateur golfers
People from Wellesley, Massachusetts
Golfers from Cleveland
Golfers from Massachusetts
2001 births
Living people